.kh is the Internet country code top-level domain 
(ccTLD) for the Kingdom of Cambodia. It was formerly administered by the Ministry of Post and Telecommunications of Cambodia from 1997. In September 2012, the domain name was transferred to the Telecommunication Regulator of Cambodia, which currently administers it. The domain name is named after the majority ethnic group of Cambodia, the Khmer people.

Only Cambodia-registered companies, government agencies, organisations and Cambodian citizens can register domain names.

Second level domains
 per.kh - Personal names.
 com.kh - Commercial entities.
 edu.kh - Educational institutions.
 gov.kh - Government entities.
 mil.kh - Military entities.
 net.kh - Network infrastructure.
 org.kh - Non-commercial organizations.

References

External links
 IANA .kh whois information
 .kh domain registration website

Country code top-level domains
Telecommunications in Cambodia
Internet in Cambodia

sv:Toppdomän#K